The Long Silence is a 1993 Italian-German-French political thriller-drama film  directed by Margarethe von Trotta. For her performance in this film Carla Gravina was awarded Best Actress at the 1993 Montreal World Film Festival and won the Italian Golden Globe for Best Actress. The film also won the Italian Golden Globes for Best Original Score and for Best Screenplay.

Plot

Cast 

Carla Gravina as Carla Aldrovandi
Jacques Perrin as  Marco Canova
Paolo Graziosi as  Francesco Mancini
Agnese Nano as  Maria Mancini
Antonella Attili as  Fantoni's Wife 
Alida Valli as   Carla's Mother
Ottavia Piccolo as  Rosa
Giuliano Montaldo as  Prosecutor 
Ivano Marescotti as  Fantoni

See also      
 List of Italian films of 1993

References

External links

1993 drama films
1993 films
German drama films
French drama films
Italian drama films
Films directed by Margarethe von Trotta
Films scored by Ennio Morricone
1990s Italian-language films
1990s French films
1990s German films